Benedetto Baaz or Benedetto Vaez (died 1631) was a Roman Catholic prelate who served as Bishop of Umbriatico (1622–1631).

Biography
On 2 May 1622, he was appointed during the papacy of Pope Paul V as Bishop of Umbriatico.
On 8 May 1622, he was consecrated bishop by Giovanni Garzia Mellini, Cardinal-Priest of Santi Quattro Coronati with Cesare Ventimiglia, Bishop of Terracina, Priverno e Sezze, and Alfonso Giglioli, Bishop of Anglona-Tursi, serving as co-consecrators. 
He served as Bishop of Umbriatico until his death in 1631.

Episcopal succession
While bishop, he was the principal co-consecrator of: 
Gaspar Gajosa, Bishop of L'Aquila (1628); 
Patrick Comerford, Bishop of Waterford and Lismore (1629); 
Gaspar de Borja y Velasco, Cardinal-Bishop of Albano (1630); and
Gil Carrillo de Albornoz, Archbishop of Taranto (1630).

References

External links and additional sources
 (for Chronology of Bishops) 
 (for Chronology of Bishops) 

17th-century Italian Roman Catholic bishops
Bishops appointed by Pope Paul V
1631 deaths